Vitālijs Jagodinskis (born 28 February 1992) is a Latvian professional footballer who plays for FK Rīgas Futbola Skola and the Latvia national team as a centre back.

Club career 
As a youth player Jagodinskis played for local club FK Daugava Rīga, being promoted to the first team in 2009. He made his Latvian Higher League debut on 1 August 2009, playing 90 minutes in a 3–0 loss to SK Blāzma.

For the second half of the 2009-10 season Jagodinskis moved to FK Jūrmala-VV, establishing himself as a first team player despite his young age. During the three seasons he spent at the club Jagodinskis made 51 league appearances in a period from 2009 to 2011, respectively.

Dynamo Kyiv
In January 2012, Jagodinskis went on trial with Ukrainian Premier League club Dynamo Kyiv alongside his international teammate Valērijs Šabala. He subsequently signed a long-term contract for four seasons with an option to extend it for another one in February 2012. In 2012, he played in the youth team, but before the start of the 2013–14 Ukrainian First League got promoted to FC Dynamo-2 Kyiv. Jagodinskis made his league debut on 14 July 2013, playing 90 minutes in a 0–0 draw against Desna Chernihiv.

Politehnica Iași
After ending his contract with Hungarian team Diósgyőri VTK in the summer of 2017, Jagodinskis signed a one-year contract with Romanian Liga I club Politehnica Iași, in October, at the request of manager Flavius Stoican.

International career 
Vitālijs Jagodinskis was a member of all of Latvia's youth national teams. In 2008 he played for Latvia U17, in 2010 for Latvia U19 and from 2011 to 2013 he captained the U21 side.

Jagodinskis was called up for the first time to the Latvia national team for the friendly match against Estonia, on 14 August 2013. Since then he has been a regular for the national team.

Honours

International
Latvia
Baltic Cup: 2016

References

External links 
 
 
 
 Dynamo Kiev profile

1992 births
Living people
Footballers from Riga
Latvian footballers
Latvian expatriate footballers
Latvia international footballers
Association football defenders
FK Daugava (2003) players
FK Ventspils players
FC Dynamo-2 Kyiv players
FC Hoverla Uzhhorod players
Diósgyőri VTK players
FC Politehnica Iași (2010) players
FK RFS players
Valmieras FK players
Ukrainian Premier League players
Liga I players
Nemzeti Bajnokság I players
Expatriate footballers in Romania
Latvian expatriate sportspeople in Romania
Expatriate footballers in Hungary
Latvian expatriate sportspeople in Hungary
Expatriate footballers in Ukraine
Latvian expatriate sportspeople in Ukraine